The 1936 Paris–Tours was the 31st edition of the Paris–Tours cycle race and was held on 3 May 1936. The race started in Paris and finished in Tours. The race was won by Gustave Danneels.

General classification

References

1936 in French sport
1936
May 1936 sports events